The integral symbol:
∫ (Unicode),  (LaTeX)
is used to denote integrals and antiderivatives in mathematics, especially in calculus.

History

The notation was introduced by the German mathematician Gottfried Wilhelm Leibniz in 1675 in his private writings; it first appeared publicly in the article "" (On a hidden geometry and analysis of indivisibles and infinites), published in Acta Eruditorum in June 1686.  The symbol was based on the ſ (long s) character and was chosen because Leibniz thought of the integral as an infinite sum of infinitesimal summands.

Typography in Unicode and LaTeX

Fundamental symbol

In HTML, it is written as  &#x222b; (hexadecimal), &#8747; (decimal) and  &int; (named entity).

The original IBM PC code page 437 character set included a couple of characters ⌠ and ⌡ (codes 244 and 245 respectively) to build the integral symbol. These were deprecated in subsequent MS-DOS code pages, but they still remain in Unicode (U+2320 and U+2321 respectively) for compatibility.

The ∫ symbol is very similar to, but not to be confused with, the letter ʃ ("esh").

Extensions of the symbol

Related symbols include:

{| class="wikitable"
|-
! Meaning 
! scope="col" colspan="2"| Unicode
! scope="col" colspan="2"| LaTeX
|-
! Double integral 
|style="font-size:20pt;"| ∬ 
|| U+222C
|| 
|| \iint
|-
! Triple integral 
|style="font-size:20pt;"| ∭
|| U+222D
|| 
|| \iiint
|-
!Quadruple integral
|style="font-size:20pt;"| ⨌
|| U+2A0C

|| 
|| \iiiint
|-
! Contour integral 
|style="font-size:20pt;"| ∮
|| U+222E
|| 
|| \oint
|-
! Clockwise integral 
|style="font-size:20pt;"| ∱
|| U+2231
|| 
|| 
|-
! Counterclockwise integral
|style="font-size:20pt;"| ⨑
|| U+2A11
|| 
|| 
|-
! Clockwise contour integral
|style="font-size:20pt;"| ∲
|| U+2232
|| 
|| \varointclockwise
|-
! Counterclockwise contour integral
|style="font-size:20pt;"| ∳
|| U+2233
|| 
|| \ointctrclockwise
|-
! Closed surface integral
|style="font-size:20pt;"| ∯
|| U+222F
|| 
|| \oiint
|-
! Closed volume integral
|style="font-size:20pt;"| ∰
|| U+2230
|| 
|| \oiiint
|-
|}

Typography in other languages 

In other languages, the shape of the integral symbol differs slightly from the shape commonly seen in English-language textbooks. While the English integral symbol leans to the right, the German symbol (used throughout Central Europe) is upright, and the Russian variant leans slightly to the left to occupy less horizontal space.

Another difference is in the placement of limits for definite integrals. Generally, in English-language books, limits go to the right of the integral symbol: 

 

By contrast, in German and Russian texts, the limits are placed above and below the integral symbol, and, as a result, the notation requires larger line spacing, but is more compact horizontally, especially when longer expressions are used in the limits:

See also 

 Capital sigma notation 
 Capital pi notation

Notes

References

External links 
 Fileformat.info

History of calculus
Mathematical symbols
Gottfried Wilhelm Leibniz